APOEL Basketball Club, better known simply as APOEL, is a Cypriot professional basketball club based in the city of Nicosia. It is a part of the APOEL multi-sport club. APOEL is one of the most successful basketball clubs in Cyprus with an overall tally of  11 Championships, 12 Cups and 11 Super Cups.

History
APOEL was formed in 1926, but the basketball team was formed in 1947. The team's first ever basketball title was the Cypriot Super Cup that won in 1972. At the end of the same season (1972–73), APOEL won their second title, the Cypriot Cup. The team achieved to win their first ever Championship title three years later, in season 1975–76.

The 90's decade was the most successful for APOEL. The team won 4 Championships, 5 Cups and 4 Super Cups during that period, including one double on the 1995–96 season.

After winning the double in 2001–02 season, APOEL won again the Championship in 2008–09 season, after 6 years without winning any title. The next season (2009–10), the team won their second consecutive Championship title and reached the quarterfinals of the FIBA EuroChallenge, marking their most successful campaign in the European competitions.

After four years without winning any title, APOEL won again the Championship in 2013–14 season, which was their 11th league title in their history. During 2015–16 season, APOEL won their 12th Cypriot Cup trophy, thirteen years after their last Cypriot Cup title. The next season (2016–17), APOEL returned in the European competitions after a five years break and reached the second round (Last 24) of the FIBA Europe Cup, marking one of their most successful seasons in the European competitions.

League positions

Honours
Cypriot Championship
 Winners (11): 1975–76, 1978–79, 1980–81, 1994–95, 1995–96, 1997–98, 1998–99, 2001–02, 2008–09, 2009–10, 2013–14

Cypriot Cup
 Winners (12) (record): 1972–73, 1978–79, 1983–84, 1985–86, 1990–91, 1992–93, 1993–94, 1994–95, 1995–96, 2001–02, 2002–03, 2015–16

 Cypriot Super Cup
 Winners (11) (record):  1972, 1976, 1986, 1994, 1995, 1996, 1998, 2001, 2002, 2010, 2014

European campaigns
Last Update: 26 January 2017

Sponsorship names
 2002–2004 Elma APOEL
 2004–2007 Dentalcon APOEL
 2007–2008 Aspis APOEL
 2008–2009 Seastar APOEL
 2009–2010 Μadisons APOEL
 2010–2013 Cytavision APOEL
 2015–2016 Cytavision APOEL

Players

Current roster

|}
| valign="top" |
 Head coach
 Marios Argyrou
 Assistant coaches
 Giannis Damalis
Legend
(C) Team captain
|}

Notable players 

Cyprus
  Giorgos Anastasiadis
  Panagiotis Serdaris
  Charis Soleas
  Christos Stylianides
  Vassilis Kounas

Belgium
  Gerben Van Dorpe

Bermuda
  Sullivan Phillips

Cameroon
  Cyrille Makanda

Croatia
  Zvonko Buljan
  Saša Čuić

Czech Republic
  Ales Chan
  Michal Křemen

France
  Michael Mokongo

Great Britain
  Ogo Adegboye
   Kyle Johnson
  Tarick Johnson

Greece
  Andreas Glyniadakis
  Michalis Kakiouzis
  Dimitrios Kalaitzidis

Israel
  Amit Tamir

Lithuania
  Martynas Andriukaitis
  Augustinas Vitas

Mali
  Ousmane Cisse

Montenegro
  Balša Radunović
  Damjan Kandić
  Boris Lalović

Serbia
  Milan Dozet
  Dušan Jelić
  Mirko Kovač
  Ivan Mičeta
  Vukašin Mandić
  Aleksandar Radojević
  Lazar Radosavljević

USA
  Rashid Atkins
  Jerome Beasley
  Rasheed Brokenborough
  Lonnie Cooper
  Jeremiah Davis
  Jamar Diggs
  Brandon Ewing
  Callistus Eziukwu
  Charron Fisher
  Darrin Fowlkes
  Ian Hanavan
  Earl Harrison
  Brandon Heath
  Rick Hughes
  Ryan Humphrey
  Mike Jones
  Wykeen Kelly
  Frankie King
  Arthur Lee
  Thaddeus McFadden
  Donte Poole
  Jeron Roberts
  Anthony Roberson
  Lewis Sims
  Dante Stiggers
  Loren Stokes
  Kevin Tiggs
  Larry Turner
  Tyson Wheeler
  Isaac Wells
  QJ Peterson

Women's team

History
APOEL also maintains a women's team which is competing in the women's Cypriot First Division. In their most successful seasons, APOEL women's team reached the Championship finals twice (2003–04 & 2004–05) and qualified two times for the semi-finals of the Cup (2004–05 & 2006–07).

References

External links
 APOEL Athletic Football Club - official website 
 APOEL B.C. Youth Academy 
 Eurobasket.com APOEL BC Page

 
Basketball
Basketball teams in Cyprus
Basketball teams established in 1947